Chariton County Jail and Sheriff's Residence is a historic combined sheriffs residence and jail located in Keytesville, Chariton County, Missouri. It was built in 1906–1907, and is a 2 1/2-story, red brick building with Queen Anne-style detailing. It has a high hipped roof with lower cross gables. At the rear is the two story, rectangular cell block. A one-story block addition was built on the jail in 1970.

It was listed on the National Register of Historic Places in 1997.

References

Government buildings on the National Register of Historic Places in Missouri
Queen Anne architecture in Missouri
Government buildings completed in 1907
Buildings and structures in Chariton County, Missouri
National Register of Historic Places in Chariton County, Missouri